Polylepis lanuginosa is a species of plant in the family Rosaceae. It is endemic to Ecuador.

References

lanuginosa
Endemic flora of Ecuador
Vulnerable plants
Taxonomy articles created by Polbot